The Owner is a multi-director, international feature film that follows a backpack around the world, on its way back to its owner. It is the first film produced by CollabFeature, a group of independent filmmakers from all over the world. Each filmmaker wrote and directed his or her own short segment of the film in his or her own country. The Owner began shooting in spring of 2010. It premiered in theaters around the world on May 25, 2012.  CollabFeature was started by Detroit-based filmmaker Marty Shea and web programmer Ian Bonner.

Plot
The Owner follows a lost backpack on a journey around the world, meeting several fascinating characters along the way. As the story progresses, we learn details about the mysterious man to whom the bag belongs—a man named "MacGuffin." The film brings together a variety of cultures, languages and film styles into a singular narrative plot.

The feature consists of 25 independently produced short segments (2 to 5 minutes) that are connected by the backpack's journey. Each segment picks up the narrative where the previous segment leaves off and in some cases are inter-cut.

Having 25 directors from 13 countries, The Owner holds the Guinness World Record for "Most Directors of a Film."  The world record claim was approved by Guinness on January 9, 2013. Previously, Paris, je t'aime held the record with 21 directors.

Filmmakers
 Marty Shea - Detroit, USA
 Rafael Yoshida - São Paulo
 Fahad Shaikh - Pakistan
 Sabine Sebaali - Beirut
 Steve Murphy - London
 Varun Mathur - New Delhi
 Brian Shephard - Orlando, FL
 Asmit Pathare - Mumbai
 Nicolas Fogliarini - Paris
 Neha Raheja Thakker - Mumbai
 Vishesh Mankal - New Delhi
 Francois Coetzee -  Cape Town
 Mairtin de Barra - Dublin
 Xavier Agudo - Berlin
 Yango González - Bogota, Colombia
 Alexander Schoenauer - Berlin
 Nino Leitner - Innsbruck, Austria
 Arne von Nostitz-Rieneck - Vienna
 Reenita Malhotra - Hong Kong
 Michael Canzoniero - New York City
 Nicole Sylvester - Brooklyn
 Todd Felderstein - Los Angeles, USA
 Prashant Sehgal - New Delhi
 John Versical - Chicago
 Craig Lines - Newcastle, England

References

External links
 
 
 Guinness World Records Official Page http://www.guinnessworldrecords.com/world-records/most-directors-of-a-film

Collaborative projects
2012 independent films
American anthology films
2012 films
2010s English-language films